The DVD Forum is an international organization composed of hardware, software, media and production companies that use and develop the DVD and formerly HD DVD formats. It was initially known as the DVD Consortium when it was founded in 1995.

History and mission
The DVD Forum was created to facilitate the exchange of information and ideas about the DVD format, another evolution of the LaserDisc format, and to enable it to grow through technical improvement and innovation. The organization hopes to promote worldwide acceptance of DVD for entertainment, consumer electronics and information technology applications. Membership in the DVD Forum is open to any company or organization involved in DVD research, development, or manufacturing; software firms and other DVD users interested in developing the format are also encouraged to join. Forum members can support other formats in addition to DVD.

The DVD Forum is responsible for the official DVD format specification. The group handles licensing of the DVD format and logo through the DVD Format and Logo Licensing Corporation (DVD FLLC), which also publishes the official "DVD Book" format specifications. Reference materials and newsletters are published for DVD Forum members.

In 2003, the DVD Forum had 208 members. In 2007, it had 195 registered members. In 2008, it had 159 registered members, and in 2010, it had 98 registered members. In 2012 this downward trend continued with the membership standing at 80 members. Since 1 April 2012, the Forum is in a "Reduced Activity Mode", however the DVD FLLC is still active as of 2020.

Structure 

The DVD Forum is governed by an elected Steering Committee. It has a Chair Company, and three Vice-Chair Companies: one from each of the consumer electronics, information technology, and content industries. The Chair and Vice-Chair Companies are elected for two-year terms.

In addition to the Steering Committee, the DVD Forum has the following committees:
Technical Coordination Group - to coordinate activities of the Working Groups and submit technical proposals to the Steering Committee
a number of Working Groups - to work on various aspects of the DVD format.
Promotion & Communication Committee - to promote the exchange of information among participants
Verification Policy Committee - to maintain compliance of DVD products with the DVD Formats adopted by the DVD Forum
Format/Logo Advisory Group - to advise the Steering Committee on matters relating to names and logos and the licensing of DVD Formats and DVD logos

Founding members

Ten companies founded the organization:
 Hitachi, Ltd.
 Panasonic
 Mitsubishi Electric Corporation
 Pioneer Electronic Corporation
 Royal Philips Electronics N.V.
 Sony Corporation
 Thomson
 WarnerMedia
 Toshiba Corporation
 Victor Company of Japan, Ltd. (JVC)
 NBCUniversal
 The Walt Disney Company

Rival formats

Competing standards developed by the rival DVD+RW Alliance are for the "plus" formats (DVD+R, DVD+RW). Alliance leaders Philips, Sony and Thomson were also founding members of the DVD Forum, established in 1997. , both plus and dash formats seem equally popular with customers, and both are compatible with the vast majority of DVD players.

See also 

 DVD+RW Alliance
 Blu-ray Disc

Notes

References 
 DVD Forum's Mission
 DVD Forum's Charter

External links 
 DVD Forum
 DVD Format / Logo Licensing Corporation (DVD FLLC)

Technology consortia
DVD
Organizations established in 1995
HD DVD